Kirklees Council is the local authority for the metropolitan borough of Kirklees in West Yorkshire, England. One third of the Council is elected each year, except every fourth year when there is no election. Since the last boundary changes in 2004, 69 councillors have been elected from 23 wards.

Prior to 1973 the area was governed as part of the West Riding County Council based in Wakefield. The area had strong Liberal party control all the way through until it was disbanded. Kirklees Metropolitan Council created heavy Labour party influence.

Political control
For elections prior to 1973 see the West Riding County Council page here:  https://en.m.wikipedia.org/wiki/West_Riding_County_Council#:~:text=West%20Riding%20County%20Council%20(WRCC,at%20County%20Hall%20in%20Wakefield.

The first election to the council was held in 1973, initially operating as a shadow authority before coming into its powers on 1 April 1974. County-level services were provided by West Yorkshire County Council until its abolition in 1986, when Kirklees became a unitary authority. Political control of the council since 1973 has been held by the following parties:

Leadership
The leaders of the council since 2000 have been:

Council elections

1998 Kirklees Metropolitan Borough Council election
1999 Kirklees Metropolitan Borough Council election
2000 Kirklees Metropolitan Borough Council election
2002 Kirklees Metropolitan Borough Council election
2003 Kirklees Metropolitan Borough Council election
2004 Kirklees Metropolitan Borough Council election
2006 Kirklees Metropolitan Borough Council election
2007 Kirklees Metropolitan Borough Council election
2008 Kirklees Metropolitan Borough Council election
2010 Kirklees Metropolitan Borough Council election
2011 Kirklees Metropolitan Borough Council election
2012 Kirklees Metropolitan Borough Council election
2014 Kirklees Metropolitan Borough Council election
2015 Kirklees Metropolitan Borough Council election
2016 Kirklees Metropolitan Borough Council election
2018 Kirklees Metropolitan Borough Council election
2019 Kirklees Metropolitan Borough Council election
2021 Kirklees Metropolitan Borough Council election
2022 Kirklees Metropolitan Borough Council election

District result maps

By-election results

Notes

References

External links
Kirklees Metropolitan Borough Council

 
Council elections in West Yorkshire
Elections in Kirklees
Local government in Kirklees
Metropolitan borough council elections in England